Mylothris carcassoni, the Carcasson's dotted border, is a butterfly in the family Pieridae. It is found in Zimbabwe, where it is known only from the type locality (Butler North, south of Mutare). The habitat consists of gallery forests.

Adults have been recorded in September and March. They generally fly high up in the forest canopy, but come down to feed on flowers on occasion.

References

Butterflies described in 1948
Pierini
Endemic fauna of Zimbabwe
Butterflies of Africa